Lindy Brigitte Leveaux-Agricole (born 14 November 1978 in Victoria, Seychelles) is a Seychellois javelin thrower. Her personal best throw is 57.86 metres, achieved in June 2005 in Victoria. This is the national record. She also holds national records in the shot put and discus throw.

International competitions

References

External links
 
 

1978 births
Living people
Seychellois javelin throwers
Female javelin throwers
Seychellois female athletes
Olympic female javelin throwers
Olympic athletes of Seychelles
Athletes (track and field) at the 2008 Summer Olympics
Commonwealth Games competitors for Seychelles
Athletes (track and field) at the 1998 Commonwealth Games
Athletes (track and field) at the 2006 Commonwealth Games
African Games bronze medalists for Seychelles
African Games medalists in athletics (track and field)
Athletes (track and field) at the 1999 All-Africa Games
Athletes (track and field) at the 2003 All-Africa Games
Athletes (track and field) at the 2007 All-Africa Games
Athletes (track and field) at the 2011 All-Africa Games
World Athletics Championships athletes for Seychelles
African Championships in Athletics winners